Marisela, or its alternative form Maricela, is a feminine given name.

People with the name include:

Marisela Arizmendi, Mexican gymnast
Marisela Cantú (born 1990), Mexican gymnast
Maricela Chávez (born 1962), Mexican racewalker
Maricela Contreras Julián (born 1961), Mexican politician
Maricela Cornejo (born 1987), American boxer
Marisela de Montecristo (born 1992), Salvadoran model
Marisela Escobedo Ortiz (1958–2010), Mexican activist
Marisela Esqueda (born 1966), American-Mexican singer
Maricela González (born 1968), Colombian actress
Maricela Montemayor (born 1991), Mexican sprint canoeist
Marisela Morales (disambiguation), multiple people
Marisela Moreno (born 1972), Panamanian model
Marisela Norte, American writer
Marisela Peralta (born 1955), Dominican Republic hurdler
Marisela Puicón, Peruvian singer
Maricela Serrano Hernández (born 1961), Mexican politician
Marisela Treviño Orta, American dramatist
Maricela Velázquez, Mexican politician

Spanish feminine given names
Portuguese feminine given names